Margaret Sunshine Cansancio Dizon (born July 3, 1983) is a Filipino actress, director and producer. She is often called as the “Daytime Drama Queen” by various media outlets for her acting prowess and a string of local hit series.

Recognized as a "seasoned thespian" in both Philippine TV & film industry, Dizon earned her first acting award as a child actress in 1995 at the prestigious FAMAS Awards. In 2017, she won a Gawad Amerika Awards for her exceptional performance in "Ika-6 Na Utos". In 2019, the PMPC Star Awards honored her as one of the "TV Queens at the Turn of the Millennium." She is best known for her memorable performances in: Encantadia, Impostora, Bakekang, Ika-6 na Utos to name a few.

Biography
Margaret Sunshine Cansancio Dizon was born on July 3, 1983 to Isagani Bengzon Dizon and Dorothy Cansancio Dizon, Dizon in Manila, is the youngest in their family. At a young age, her mother who was then a part of the Producers' Guild of the Philippines who used to produce films and TV shows noticed her interest in show business and would always tag her along on gatherings with other producers. Since she is shameless or "makapal and mukha" as she would say it, whenever she was asked to cry or sing, she always delivers in a snap of a finger. She was then given the chance to be a part of her very first movie "God's Little Children" at the age of three.

Career

Acting
Sunshine Dizon started acting at the age of three. Her screen name then was simply "Sunshine". The first movie that she did was "God's Little Children".

She has already worked in Kung Kasalanan Man (1989), Hindi Pa Tapos Ang Laban and Kahit Butas ng Karayom Papasukin Ko where she got her first acting recognition as Best Child Actress from FAMAS.

In television, she became a regular on Bubble Gang. She also became part of That's Entertainment for six months. After which, VIVA signed her and cast her in DATS.

She became part of the ABS-CBN drama anthology series Maalaala Mo Kaya, having a role on the episodes "Abaniko" (1992), "Palara" (1994), and "Latay" (1995).

She played one of the leads in the TV series Anna Karenina as well as on the cast of Thank God It's Sabado. She starred in Honey, My Love, So Sweet (1999) and Kiss Mo Ko (1999).

Dizon's films include Honey, My Love So Sweet and Kiss Mo Ko.

Sunshine Dizon appeared in the television series, Anna Karenina.

In 2001, she starred in the prime-time television drama Ikaw Lang ang Mamahalin with Angelika Dela Cruz and later the soap opera Kung Mawawala Ka. She was cast in Masikip sa Dibdib (2004) and the TV sitcom Daboy en Da Girl (2002), Mga Batang Lansangan... Ngayon (2002), Filipinas (2003) and Sabel (2004). She also starred in the GMA mini-series Umulan Man o Umaraw and Tuwing Kapiling Ka.

She played Sang'gre Pirena in Encantadia for which she won two Best Actress Awards from ENPRESS and Gawad Amerika.

She appeared in the sitcom Bahay Mo Ba 'To? and Captain Barbell as well as the title role in Carlo J. Caparas' Bakekang, for which she received the Best Actress by PMPC Star Awards.

In Impostora, she played a dual role and later appeared in La Vendetta for GMA Network who signed her as an exclusive contract star. She was cast in the GMA Films' movie Dagaw and Sundo which to be aired in 2009.

In 2008, she starred in Obra. In 2009, Dizon started taping for All About Eve.

In 2012, Dizon briefly returned to Philippine television, appearing on Regine Velasquez-Alcasid's cooking/talk show Sarap Diva along with Katrina Halili. Later in 2013, Dizon has made her acting comeback via Mundo Mo'y Akin where she plays Perlita Mendoza. The appearance of Dizon's character in Mundo Mo'y Akin is quite similar to her previous titular role in Bakekang.

In 2016, Dizon was joining again in the retelling-sequel of Encantadia in which she plays Adhara. This also serves as her return in that said show but with a different role. But in the middle of the series, she left the production to be a part of the show Ika-6 na Utos where she played the role of Emma de Jesus, her most personal role. It started airing last December 5, 2016, which later got extensions proven to be with the ratings and viewers alike. And in 2019, she played Laura Ramirez-Santos in the series Magkaagaw.

She returned to ABS-CBN despite the denial of its legislative broadcast franchise renewal, on April 30, 2021, and Sunshine Dizon is part of the new series called Marry Me, Marry You produced by Dreamscape Entertainment, starring Paulo Avelino, Janine Gutierrez and Jake Ejercito. One year and nine months after her second time staying in ABS-CBN, Dizon returned to GMA Network on January 22, 2023 as part of the cast in the upcoming show Mga Lihim ni Urduja.

Personal life
In 2010, Dizon married a businessman Timothy Tan. However, after 6 years of marriage, they separated after Dizon found out that her husband had an affair with another woman.

Directing
In 2016, Dizon made her directorial debut as an in-house television director of the weekend programs produced by 8TriMedia Broadcasting Network through its television channel 8TriTV on CableLink Channel 7.

Filmography

Television

Drama anthologies

Comedy shows

Hosting

Films

Awards

|-
| 2017
|  OFW GAWAD PARANGAL 2017
| Best Actress Awardee for Ika6-Na Utos
| rowspan="24" 
|-
| 2017 ||  16th Gawad Amerika Awards  || Most Outstanding Filipina Actress in Television Awardee for Ika6-Na Utos
|-
| 2016 || 30th PMPC Star Awards for TV || Best Supporting Actress Awardee  for Little Nanay
|-
| 2015 || 63rd FAMAS || Best Supporting Actress  Nomination for Hustisya
|-
| 2014 || 5th Golden Screen TV Awards || Outstanding Supporting Actress in a Drama Series Nomination for Mundo Mo'y Akin
|-
|rowspan="3"| 2009 || rowspan="2"| 23rd PMPC Star Awards for TV  || Female Face of the Night winner
|-
| Best Single Performance by an Actress for Obra butch episode-
|-
| SOP Tag Awards ||  Female Kapuso Fun Favorite Nominee  
|-
| 2008 || 22nd PMPC Star Awards for TV ||  Best Actress Awardee for Impostora
|-
| 2007 || 21st PMPC Star Awards for TV ||  Best Actress Awardee for Bakekang
|-
|rowspan="4"| 2006 || 3rd Gawad Amerika Awards ||  Best Actress Awardee for Encantadia
|-
|20th PMPC Star Awards for TV ||  Best Drama Actress Nominee for Encantadia: Pag-ibig Hanggang Wakas
|-
|54th PMPC Star Awards for Movies|| Best Supporting Actress Nomination for Mulawin The Movie
|-
|USTv Students' Choice Awards || Students' Choice for Best Actress Nominee  for Encantadia
|-
| rowspan="7"| 2005 || 18th PMPC Star Awards for TV ||  Best Single Performance by an Actress Nominee for Magpakailanman: Silang Mga Inihabilin ng Langit
|-
|2nd ENPRESS Golden Screen Entertainment TV Awards  ||  Outstanding Lead Actress in a Drama Series Awardee for Encantadia 
|-
|Kapuso's Viewers Choice Awards ||  Idol Mong Anti-Bida Nominee for Encantadia
|-
| 53rd PMPC Star Awards for Movies ||rowspan="4"| Best Supporting Actress Nominee for Sabel 
|-
|53rd FAMAS Awards
|-
|Film Academy of the Philippines Awards
|-
| Metro Manila Film Festival 
|-
| 2004 || 1st ENPRESS Golden Screen Entertainment TV Awards  || Outstanding Lead Actress in a Drama Special Awardee for Magpakailanman: Babangon Din Ang Kahapon
|-
| 2003 || 16th PMPC Star Awards for TV ||  Best Single Performance by an Actress Nominee for Magpakailanman: Kakaibang Mukha Ng Pag-ibig
|-
| 1995|| FAMAS ||  Best Child Actress  for Kahit Butas ng Karayom, Papasukin Ko
|}

References

External links

1983 births
Living people
Filipino film actresses
Filipino child actresses
ABS-CBN personalities
GMA Network personalities
Actors from Manila
Tagalog people
That's Entertainment Friday Group Members
That's Entertainment (Philippine TV series)
Visayan people
Viva Artists Agency
Filipino television actresses